Foreign relations exist between Azerbaijan and Serbia. Serbia has an embassy in Baku. Azerbaijan has an embassy in Belgrade. Both countries are members of United Nations, Council of Europe, Partnership for Peace, Organization of the Black Sea Economic Cooperation (BSEC), and Organization for Security and Co-operation in Europe (OSCE).

History

The 223rd Belgrade Red Banner Azerbaijan Rifle Division – formed from Azerbaijani people participated in the liberation of Yugoslavia and Belgrade from Nazi Germany during World War II.

High level visits 

Serbian Foreign Minister Vuk Jeremić paid a visit to Azerbaijan in 2009 and President of Serbia Boris Tadić paid an official visit to Azerbaijan in 2010. During his visit, Tadić have visited the graves of Black January victims and discussed bilateral and strategic relations between two countries.

President of Azerbaijan Ilham Aliyev paid an official visit to Serbia in 2011. Aliyev and Tadic unveiled a bust to Uzeyir Hajibeyov in the city of Novi Sad as well as attended the opening of Tasmajdan Park in Belgrade.

In early February 2013, the presidents of Serbia and Azerbaijan, Tomislav Nikolić and Ilham Aliyev, unearthed a monument to a Serbian scientist Nikola Tesla in Baku.

Two countries are interested in co-operation in energy and education areas. The meetings between foreign ministers Vuc Jeremic and Elmar Mammadyarov are regular.  

The books Colors and Color dreams, which consist of poetic cycles of colors by Rasul Rza, People's Poet of Azerbaijan, were published in Belgrade.

Political relations

Serbia was among the countries that had voted in favour of Azerbaijan in United Nations General Assembly Resolution 62/243 which was a resolution of the United Nations General Assembly regarding Nagorno-Karabakh. On the day when Republic of Kosovo official declared its independence from Serbia, Khazar Ibrahim had  stated that Azerbaijan "views this illegal act as being in contradiction with international law. Proceeding from this, Azerbaijan's position is clear: it does not recognise Kosovo's independence". Azerbaijan has also withdrawn peacekeepers from Kosovo. Turkey has been exerting significant efforts at a senior-level gathering of the Organization of the Islamic Conference (OIC) being held in Dakar, Senegal, to have a strongly worded statement lending support to Kosovo's declaration of independence issued but among some countries Azerbaijan opposed. During the first meeting of Azerbaijan-Serbia intergovernmental commission on 4 November 2011 Co-chairmen of the commission Azerbaijan Minister of Economic Development Shahin Mustafayev showed Azerbaijan's support. Serbia, in return, have stated that they will keep on supporting Azerbaijan's position in the conflict against to Armenia. Azerbaijani Culture Center were also opened in Belgrade. The two countries are also planning to cancel visa regime.

See also
Foreign relations of Azerbaijan
Foreign relations of Serbia
Azerbaijan–Kosovo relations

References

External links
 Serbian Embassy in Azerbaijan
 Azerbaijani embassy in Belgrade

 
Serbia
Bilateral relations of Serbia